Imuruk Lake is the largest body of fresh water in Seward Peninsula in the U.S. state of Alaska. A low gap in the divide between the lake and the head of the right fork of Goodhope River rises only a few feet above the lake. The Fairhaven Ditch takes practically all its water from the lake.

References

Bodies of water of Nome Census Area, Alaska
Lakes of Alaska
Bodies of water of the Seward Peninsula